Demon Roach Underground (DRU) was a Lubbock, Texas based BBS that was popular in the "hacker" scene.

Grandmaster Ratte' was the SysOp of DRU, and the BBS was the "base system" for his group Cult of the Dead Cow, a computer hacker organization.

It ran from 1985 to 1999, though the name changed twice in its early existence.  The original name of the BBS was "The Amazing Captain Neato (TACN) BBS."  The name was then changed to "The Marauding C*A*M*E*L," before Ratte' changed the name for the final time to DRU.

The BBS ran GBBS software and was hosted on an Apple IIGS for its entire original lifetime.

Login 

After connecting, the user was required to enter a certain word to be able to log into the BBS.  Entries that would allow the user to enter the main DRU system included "THRASH" "GRUNGE" "CARCINOGEN" and "PIGFUCK".

The BBS required a new user password in order to gain access.  The password was "VOID".

The DRU login screen displayed the following warning:

"Warning: This BBS may contain explicit descriptions of, or advocate one or more of the following: adultery, murder, morbid violence, bad grammar, deviant sexual conduct in violent contexts, or the consumption of alcohol and illegal drugs. But then again, it may not. Who knows?"  This warning is now displayed on the cDc web site.

History 

 September 27, 1985 - DRU goes online
 1986 - An ASCII Express (AE) was added to the BBS.  It was called "The Polka AE."  This name is a parody of the "Metal AE," which was a popular AE at the time.  Entering the word "KILL" at the GBBS entry prompt launched "The Polka AE" (rather than DRU); "KILL" was also the entry for "the Metal AE."
 1993 - A fake-version of the BBS was added.  It was called "Demon Roach Underground Elite."  At the main BBS entry prompt, one entered "SMASH."  This version of the BBS did not require a new user password.  An interesting feature was that the user list showed the passwords for all users, including the sysop.  Thus, any user could log in as any other user.  Messages were often posted and e-mails were often sent under other users' names.
 1999 - DRU ends its run as a public BBS
 2002 - DRU is reborn as an exclusive, invitation-only system

External links  
 Simulation of DRU login screen
 CULT OF THE DEAD COW homepage
 806 BBS List

Bulletin board systems
Cult of the Dead Cow
Wikipedia articles with ASCII art